Masuzawa may refer to:
 Tomoko Masuzawa, Professor of History and Comparative Literature at the University of Michigan
 9216 Masuzawa, a minor planet named after Hitoshi Masuzawa, a lecturer and curator of the Gotoh Planetarium and Astronomical Museum in Tokyo
 Masuzawa Station, a railway station in the city of Tōno, Iwate, Japan